Helenówka may refer to the following places:
Helenówka, Łódź Voivodeship (central Poland)
Helenówka, Masovian Voivodeship (east-central Poland)
Helenówka, Świętokrzyskie Voivodeship (south-central Poland)